Let's Do It is a Canadian sports instruction television series which aired on CBC Television in 1974.

Premise
This series explained how to improve physical fitness and included segments featuring sports that were less represented in television coverage.

Scheduling
This half-hour series was broadcast Wednesdays at 7:30 p.m. (Eastern) from 26 June to 11 September 1974.

References

External links
 

CBC Television original programming
1974 Canadian television series debuts
1974 Canadian television series endings